

"Pratar med min müsli (hur det än verkar)" ("Talking to my muesli (however that goes)") is a pop song written by Swedish singer and composer Per Gessle. It is the third single released from the album En händig man. It was originally intended as a promo-only single to be out on the beginning of October 2007. It was delayed and finally released alongside "Shopping With Mother" as a double A-side single. It wasn't as successful as previous singles from the album, spending only 2 weeks in the Swedish Singles Chart, eventually peaking at #47.

"Shopping With Mother", is an instrumental track specially recorded to be the theme song for "Boston Tea Party", a weekly TV-show aired by Swedish Kanal 5. Per himself made a series of guest appearances there (from 24 September until 26 November), the song being premiered in the last episode.

A video was also filmed, directed by Jens Jansson.

Formats and track listings

Swedish CD single
(0946 3972372 0; November 28, 2007)
"Pratar med min müsli (hur det än verkar)" (Single edit) - 2:48
"Shopping With Mother" - 2:43
"Shopping With Mother (Voz Vibrante Remix)" - 3:57
"Shopping With Mother (Mother's Dub by Voz Vibrante)" - 3:56

Charts

Personnel
"Pratar med min müsli (hur det än verkar)'"
Producers: Clarence Öfwerman, Christoffer Lundquist & Per Gessle
Music & lyrics: Per Gessle
Publisher: Jimmy Fun Music
Sleeve: Kjell Andersson & Pär Wickholm
Photo: Anton Corbijn

"Shopping With Mother"
Producers: Clarence Öfwerman, Christoffer Lundquist & Per Gessle
Music & lyrics: Per Gessle
Remixes (3 & 4): Voz Vibrante (Real name: Erik Hjärpe)
Publisher: Jimmy Fun Music
Photo: Åsa Nordin-Gessle (credited as "Woody")

References 

2007 singles
Per Gessle songs
Songs written by Per Gessle
2007 songs
EMI Records singles